Joseph Douglas Hunter (August 27, 1881 – September 16, 1970) was a Canadian politician. He served in the Legislative Assembly of British Columbia from 1937 to 1941  from the electoral district of Victoria City, a member of the Conservative party.

References

1881 births
1970 deaths